Calopteryx orientalis is a species of broad-winged damselfly in the family Calopterygidae.

The IUCN conservation status of Calopteryx orientalis is "LC", least concern, with no immediate threat to the species' survival. The population is stable. The IUCN status was reviewed in 2009.

Subspecies
These two subspecies belong to the species Calopteryx orientalis:
 Calopteryx orientalis orientalis
 Calopteryx orientalis risi Schmidt, 1954

References

Further reading

 

Calopterygidae
Articles created by Qbugbot
Insects described in 1887